Samuel Sanford Shapiro (born July 13, 1930) is an American statistician and engineer. He is a professor emeritus of statistics at Florida International University. He is known for his co-authorship of the Shapiro–Wilk test and the Shapiro–Francia test.

A native of New York City, Shapiro graduated from City College of New York with a degree in statistics in 1952, and took an MS in industrial engineering at Columbia University in 1954. He briefly served as a statistician in the US Army Chemical Corps, before earning a MS (1960) and PhD (1963) in statistics at Rutgers University. In 1972 he joined the faculty at Florida International University.

In 1987 he was elected a Fellow of the American Statistical Association.

References

External links 
 Website at Florida International University

1930 births
Living people
American statisticians
City College of New York alumni
Columbia School of Engineering and Applied Science alumni
Rutgers University alumni
Florida International University faculty
Fellows of the American Statistical Association